Bandaya movement is a progressive [rebel] literary movement in Kannada started by D. R. Nagaraj and Shudra Shrinivas in 1974. It promoted socially-committed literature and sought to make poetry a weapon against social and economic injustice. "Let poetry be a sword! The dear friend who responds to the pain of people!" ["Khadgavaagali kavya! Janara novige midiva pranamitra!"], was the slogan for the movement coined by D.R. Nagaraj. 

Prominent Kannada writers who identified themselves with the movement are Siddalingaiah, Chandrashekhar Patil, Chennanna Valikar, Kalegowda Nagavar, Poornachandra Tejaswi, H.S. Shivaprakash, B.T. Lalitha Naik, Kum. Veerabhadrappa, Baraguru Ramachandrappa, Prahlad Betageri, Allama Prabhu Bettadur, Geetha Nagabhushan, K. S. Bhagwan, Shantarasa, Mallika Ghanti, Shashikala Veeriah Swamy, Banjagere Jayaprakash, Gangadhar Mudaliar, Gudihalli Nagaraj, Ramzan Darga, (late) Sugayya.S. Hiremath, Sukanya Maruti, K. Sharifa, Banu Mustaq, Dr Anupama, Nemichandra, Ki.Ram. Nagaraj, Dr.Rajashekhar Hatagundi, L. Hanumanthaiah, Bolbandeppa, (late) Linganna Satyampet, Satyanand Patrot, Basavaraj Sabarad, Sarjoo Katkar, Anand Zunjarwad, Jambanna Amarachinta, Gavisiddha Bellary, Suryakanth Gunakimath, Kamaraj, L.N. Mukundraj, H.L. Pushpa, R.G. Halli Nagaraj and Satish Kulkarni.

Further reading 
 Nagaraj, D.R. (2011) The Flaming Feet and Other Essays: The Dalit Movement in India. Edited by Prithvi Datta Chandra Shobhi. Ranikhet: Permanent Black.
 Satyanarayana, K & Tharu, Susie (2013) From those Stubs Steel Nibs are Sprouting, Dossier 2: Kannada and Telugu, New Delhi: HarperCollins India.

References

External links 
A brief introduction to the Bandaya movement, its history, aims and objectives. Excerpted from the book ನಡುಗಾಲದ ಕನ್ನಡನಾಡು (ಏಕೀಕರಣೋತ್ತರ ಕನ್ನಡ ಸಾಹಿತ್ಯ ಸಂಸ್ಕೃತಿ ಕಥನ) Kanaja archives. 

Bandaya writers
Kannada literature